Nabokov's Congeries was a collection of work by Vladimir Nabokov published in 1968 and reprinted in 1971 as The Portable Nabokov. Because Nabokov supervised its production less than a decade before he died, it is useful in attempting to identify which works Nabokov considered to be his best, especially among his short stories.

Contents
 Editor's Introduction by Page Stegner
 A Bibliographical Note
 Vladimir Nabokov: A Chronology

The Artist Himself
 From Speak, Memory: An Autobiography Revisited

Eleven Stories
 "Terra Incognita"
 "Cloud, Castle, Lake" (Облако, озеро, башня)
 "The Visit to the Museum" (Посещение музея)
 "Spring in Fialta" (Весна в Фиальте)
 "That in Aleppo Once..."
 "The Assistant Producer"
 "Signs and Symbols"
 "First Love"
 "Lance"
 "The Vane Sisters"
 "Scenes from the Life of a Double Monster"

Essays and Criticism
 On a Book Entitled Lolita
 Introduction to Bend Sinister
 Foreword to Mihail Lermontov's A Hero of Our Time
 From Nikolai Gogol: The Government Specter
 From the Commentary to Eugene Onegin: On Romanticism; The Art of the Duel
 From Eugene Onegin: A Sample Translation from Chapter One, Stanzas I-VIII
 Reply to My Critics

A Novel and Three Excerpts
 Pnin complete
 From Despair
 From Invitation to a Beheading
 From The Gift

Poems
 The Refrigerator Awakes
 A Literary Dinner
 A Discovery
 An Evening of Russian Poetry
 Restoration
 Lines Written in Oregon
 Ode to a Model
 On Translating Eugene Onegin
 Rain
 The Ballad of Longwood Glen

A Textual Note
The text of "The Assistant Producer" contained in Nabokov's Congeries omits the story's final two paragraphs, which had apparently been inadvertently dropped from all English-language editions of the story subsequent to the first. This was explained by the author's son in his introduction to the posthumously published collection The Stories of Vladimir Nabokov (1995), in which the story appears with its final paragraphs restored.

Short story collections by Vladimir Nabokov
1968 short story collections
Viking Press books